Set at the back of Campbells Creek, the trees here were originally selected by Baron Von Mueller, the famed botanist who designed the Castlemaine Botanical Gardens.  The 37-40 Campbells Creek Fryer Road Reserve is the sport and recreation hub for the local community and features...
 Cricket nets
 Football goal posts
 Male change-rooms
 Netball court
 Oval
 Oval lights
 Pavilion
 Playground
 Synthetic cricket wicket
 Trotting track
The Mount Alexander Shire Council is responsible for the management of the land, via the Campbells Creek Recreation Reserve Committee of Management (a Section 86 Committee).  This group of local volunteers works to manage and maintain the reserve.  The Committee of Management members are all actively involved with the various sporting groups that use the club-rooms, ground and trotting track and are always striving to bring out the best in their facility.

The Recreation Reserve hosts a range of events each year, including the KR Don Christmas party, Castlemaine Lawn Mower Racing and local school athletic days. Calling the Reserve home are the...
 Campbells Creek Colts Cricket Club
 Campbells Creek Football Netball Club
 Campbells Creek Junior Football Club
 Campbells Creek Trotting Club.

References

Parks in Victoria (Australia)